The Scottish Cup is an annual knockout competition for Scottish men's basketball clubs. The inaugural competition was held in 1947.

History
The first Scottish Cup was held in 1947, the same season that leagues in both the east and west of Scotland began to form. The inaugural winners were Pleasance, who beat Aberdeen University.

List of Scottish Cup finals

See also
 Scottish Basketball Championship

References

Basketball in Scotland
Basketball cup competitions in the United Kingdom
Basketball cup competitions in Europe